Ahmad Salar-e Kalat Tayebi (also Romanized as Aḩmad Sālār-e Kalāt Ţayebī; also known as Aḩmad Sālār) is a village in Tayebi-ye Sarhadi-ye Sharqi Rural District, Charusa District, Kohgiluyeh County, Kohgiluyeh and Boyer-Ahmad Province, Iran. At the 2006 census, its population was 166, in 32 families.

References 

Populated places in Kohgiluyeh County